The Gorilla Falls Exploration Trail (formerly known as Pangani Forest Exploration Trail from August 1998 to May 2016) is a walkway next to Kilimanjaro Safaris at the Disney's Animal Kingdom in the Walt Disney World Resort, Florida, from which visitors can see African animals. It is about three-eighths of a mile in length. There are "research students" positioned at most locations to give information about the animals and answer questions.

The attraction originally opened on April 22, 1998 as Gorilla Falls Exploration Trail, but the name was changed to Pangani Forest Exploration Trail in August 1998. The attraction reverted to its original name on May 27, 2016.

Animals
Angolan black-and-white colobus
Okapi
Arabian spiny mouse
Naked mole-rat
Pancake tortoise
Kenyan sand boa
Ball python
African bullfrog
Angolan python
Hippopotamus
Grevy's zebra
Meerkat
Western lowland gorilla

Aviary
Red-and-yellow barbet
Hammerkop
Great blue turaco
Amethyst starling
Northern carmine bee-eater
Racket-tailed roller
Blue-bellied roller
African olive pigeon
White-headed buffalo weaver
Tambourine dove
Purple glossy starling
Taveta golden weaver
Green woodhoopoe
Snowy-crowned robin-chat
Marbled teal
African pygmy goose
Bruce's green pigeon
African jacana
Black-cheeked lovebird

Fish
Lake Victoria cichlid

References

External links 
 Walt Disney World Resort - Pangani Forest Exploration Trail

Walt Disney Parks and Resorts attractions
Disney's Animal Kingdom 
Africa (Disney's Animal Kingdom)
1998 establishments in Florida